(formerly Mori Seiki Co., Ltd.) is a Japanese company, headquartered in Nakamura-ku, Nagoya, engaged primarily in the manufacture and sale of machine tools.

Since its establishment in 1948, it has grown into one of the largest machine tool builders in the world. With its sister company in Germany, DMG Mori Seiki AG, it markets machine tools worldwide under the brand DMG Mori.

Circa 2009, Japan's Mori Seiki entered into a strategic partnership with Germany's Deckel-Maho-Gildemeister (DMG) of Gildemeister AG, yielding the current two DMG Mori Seiki organizations. In 2015 it was reported that the company will carry out a takeover bid to acquire its German partner.

Details
DMG MORI SEIKI CO., LTD. is a manufacturer of machine tools, peripherals and systems, with more than 160,000 installations around the world. Mori Seiki is directed by President , Dr. Eng., and employs over 4,000 individuals worldwide.

In the 21st century, DMG MORI SEIKI CO., LTD. established the Digital Technology Laboratory (DTL) in Davis, California, USA. The mission of the DTL is to develop advanced software for new products.

Corporate affairs
The worldwide headquarters are located in Nakamura-ku, Nagoya, Aichi Prefecture.

The U.S. headquarters are located in the Chicago Technical Center in Hoffman Estates, Illinois near Chicago with locations in Boston, Cincinnati, Dallas, Detroit, Los Angeles and New Jersey. The facility overlooks Interstate 90 (Jane Addams Memorial Tollway). The building has  of space and includes classrooms. In November 2009 the current U.S. headquarters opened during a four-day event with over 2,200 visitors. On April 1, 2010, as part of the deal between Mori Seiki and Gildemeister AG (DMG) the U.S. divisions of both companies merged into one unit.

DMG MORI SEIKI CO., LTD. has its offices in the Middlemarch Business Park in Coventry. MORI SEIKI GmbH, the European division, has its head office in Wernau, Germany.

In 2009, DMG MORI SEIKI CO., LTD. relocated its U.S. headquarters to a newly built building, designed by Itasca, Illinois-based Cornerstone Architects Ltd., located in the AT&T corporate center in Hoffman Estates.

From October 1, 2013, the company renamed from Mori Seiki Co., Ltd. to DMG MORI SEIKI CO., LTD..

In 2016, DMG Mori opened its new 200,000 m2 plant in Ulyanovsk, Russia, starting production of its ecoline group of machine tools there, plus attendant training and service facilities.

Products and Technologies

DMG MORI SEIKI CO., LTD.'s major products include computer numerical control (CNC) lathes, parallel-twin-spindle turning centers, multi-axis turning centers, five-axis turning centers, vertical machining centers, horizontal machining centers, linear motor-driven horizontal machining centers, operating systems, machining support systems, networking systems, and production support systems. Mori Seiki has 29 subsidiaries and six associated companies.

Throughout its history, the company has developed more than 200 models of CNC lathes and machining centers.

Service

DMG MORI SEIKI CO., LTD. provides service and support over the life of its machines. Service centers throughout the country provide customers local support with global backing.

Motorsports involvement
In 2014, DMG MORI SEIKI CO., LTD. became the exclusive premium partner of the Porsche 919 Hybrid Team, supporting its return to the top category of the FIA World Endurance Championship.

DMG MORI is also a partner of the Toyota Gazoo Racing World Rally Team.

References

External links

Machine tool builders
Manufacturing companies based in Nagoya
Companies listed on the Tokyo Stock Exchange
Manufacturing companies established in 1948
Japanese companies established in 1948
Japanese brands